Trifurcula sanctaecrucis is a moth of the family Nepticulidae. It is endemic to the Canary Islands.

The larvae feed on Lavandula canariensis. They mine the leaves of their host plant. The mine consists of a gallery, alternating between upper-surface and lower-surface. The frass is deposited in an almost continuous line that leaves a clear margin at either side. The rind of the stem may also be mined in young shoots.

External links
bladmineerders.nl
Fauna Europaea

Nepticulidae
Moths of Africa
Moths described in 1908